Grassy is a rural locality in the local government area (LGA) of King Island in the north-west and west LGA region of Tasmania. The 2016 census recorded a population of 139 for the state suburb of Grassy. It was a tungsten mining town. Evidence of this can still be found in the small town. The highest population of Grassy was 767 in 1971.

History 
Grassy is a confirmed locality.

Grassy Post Office first opened on 11 March 1918 and closed in 1991.

Geography
The waters of Bass Strait form the eastern and south-eastern boundaries.

Road infrastructure 
Route B25 (Grassy Road) provides access to the locality.

References

Towns in Tasmania
King Island (Tasmania)
1918 establishments in Australia